Alland'Huy-et-Sausseuil is a commune in the Ardennes department in the Grand Est region of northern France.

Geography
Alland'Huy-et-Sausseuil is located some 10 km east of Rethel and 35 km south-west of Charleville-Mézières. The D30 road from Amagne to Écordal passes through the northern part of the commune. The village can be accessed off the D30 via the D14 which passes through the village then continues east to Charbogne. There is also the D43 road from just south of Écordal which passes south through the commune to Saulces-Champenoises. A branch railway line passes through the commune from Lucquy station in the west to the station just south of the village and the line continues south-east to Attigny station. Apart from the village the commune consists entirely of farmland.

La Foivre stream flows south through the eastern part of the commune and continues to join the Aisne south of the commune. There are several other small streams in the east of the commune and the Ruisseau de Saulces in the west.

Neighbouring communes and villages

History
This commune was occupied by the Germans during the First World War and again during the Second. The village was partially destroyed.

On 6 April 1944 six people were arrested on the Chesnois farm and deported for helping airmen of the U.S. Air Force, whose aircraft were shot down, to evade capture by the Germans.

Heraldry

Administration

List of Successive Mayors

Population

Sites and Monuments

The Church of Saint Catherine (12th century) is a Romanesque church located in the heart of the village. The building was listed as a historical monument in 1986.
Some beautiful fortified farms, mostly made of brick.
A Chateau in the hamlet of Sausseuil.

Notable people linked to the commune
Charles Batteux (1713-1780) was a clergyman, Translator, Latin scholar, author of scholastic books. Professor of rhetoric. Held a Chair of Greek and Latin philosophy. Member of the Academy of Sciences in 1754.
The French Resistance fighters arrested by the Gestapo at the Chesnois farm in 1944: the Fromentin family (Georges, Georgette, Jean, Lucienne), Paul Sagnet, Blanche Deloche-Sagnet, Charles Lambert, Robert Couvin.

See also
Communes of the Ardennes department

References

External links
Alland'Huy-et-Sausseuil on the old National Geographic Institute website 
Alland'Huy-et-Sausseuil on Géoportail, National Geographic Institute (IGN) website 
Allandhuy and Sausscuille on the 1750 Cassini Map

Communes of Ardennes (department)